Yohanes Kabagaimu (born December 16, 1980) is an Indonesian footballer who currently plays for Persiwa Wamena in the Indonesia Super League.

Club career statistics

References

External links

1980 births
Association football midfielders
Living people
Indonesian footballers
Indonesian Christians
Papuan sportspeople
Liga 1 (Indonesia) players
Persiwa Wamena players
Indonesian Premier Division players
Perseman Manokwari players